The Korg DS-8 is four-oscillator digital FM synthesizer released by Korg in 1987 which used the Yamaha FB-01 FM synthesis engine.

Features
The DS-8 is 61 Keys in length, is velocity sensitive with aftertouch and stores up to 100 programs and 10 combinations in its internal memory. By using one of the optional non-volatile (but battery-powered) Korg RAM cards MCR-01, MCR-02, or MCR-03 this program memory can be expanded by extra programs and combinations: 100/10 for the MCR-01, 200/20 for the MCR-02, or 400/40 for the MCR-03. Programs can be backed up and received via standard MIDI dumps.

It features one joystick controller for bending pitch, timbre and modulation speed, one card slot for the aforementioned Korg RAM Cards, MIDI IN/OUT/THRU jacks, a damper pedal, assignable pedal, assignable switch, program up pedal, one balance slider, four keyboard modes (Single, Layer, Double and Multi) and two slider controls which indicate the ability to edit the two oscillators from fast to slow.
The three editable banks shown on the right side of the board (Function, Voice Parameter and Combi Parameter) provide multiple ways in which the user can edit the programs, banks and patches.

At $1400 RRP the DS-8 was a revolutionary, cheap and affordable product for its time.

Notable users
 Rick Wakeman

References

Further reading

External links
 Korg DS-8 Manual

DS-8
Polyphonic synthesizers
Digital synthesizers
Musical instruments invented in the 1980s